Kevin J. Coughlin (born May 13, 1970) is a former Republican member of the Ohio Senate, who represented the 27th District from 2001 to 2010. He was a member of the Ohio House of Representatives from 1997 until 2000.  He served as Clerk of the Stow Municipal Court from 2013-2015. Since 2010, he has been President of  Lexington Companies, Ltd, a public affairs and investment company.

Life and career
Coughlin graduated from Woodridge High School in Peninsula, Ohio, in 1988, received a BA from Bowling Green State University in 1992, and a Master of Public Administration from BGSU in 1994. In 1996, he ran for the Ohio House of Representatives after Representative Wayne Jones vacated to run for the Ohio Senate.  He won the seat, and was sworn into office on January 3, 1997.  He won reelection in 1998 with 63.64%, and again in 2000 with 63.9% of the vote.

Coughlin served two and one half terms in the Ohio House of Representatives.

Ohio Senate
After four terms in the Ohio Senate, Senator Roy Ray retired early in 2001, leaving Senate Republicans to appoint someone to the vacant 27th District.  Coughlin was appointed, and was sworn into office on February 2, 2001.  He won his own four-year term in 2002 with 52.98% of the electorate against Democrat Tom Bevan.  He won reelection in 2006 with 52.28% again Judy Hanna. In the Ohio Senate, Coughlin was Chairman of the Senate Health, Human Services, & Aging Committee from 2004 to 2011.

Among Coughlin's achievements in office:
 Authored the law creating Ohio's Amber Alert System, aiding in the safe return of missing and abducted children.
 Authored Ohio's Prompt Pay law and the Health Care Accountability Act, streamlining the administrative relationship between physicians and insurance companies.
 Co-authored Ohio's Healthy Choices for Healthy Children Act, a comprehensive school-based approach to addressing child obesity and wellness.
 Co-authored Ohio's law protecting private property owners from unwarranted takings of land through eminent domain.
 Sponsored Ohio's election reform law implementing the Help American Vote Act requirements and reducing voter fraud.
 Authored law helping Ohio's sheriffs to better protect communities from sex offenders.
 Authored legislation creating Ohio's special needs scholarship for children with special need to attend the school of their choice.

Later career
In 2009, Coughlin announced his candidacy for Governor of Ohio.  He exited the campaign after former congressman John Kasich announced his candidacy.

Coughlin formed an exploratory committee to consider a run for United States Senate in 2012. In October 2011 he announced he would not run citing incumbent Sherrod Brown's strong polling numbers.

Coughlin owns Lexington Companies, which provides public affairs and communications, and serves as a holding company for real estate and business investment ventures. He serves on the board of directors of the Ohio Capital Square Foundation and is a member the Summit County Republican Executive Committee and Finance Committee.  He lives in Bath, Ohio.

References

External links
Kevin Coughlin.com official website
Lexington Companies official website

Republican Party Ohio state senators
Republican Party members of the Ohio House of Representatives
Bowling Green State University alumni
1970 births
Living people
21st-century American politicians